Guanghui Palace, commonly known as Zhang–Wang Temple, is a Taoist temple located in Nanxun of Huzhou, Zhejiang, China.

History
The temple was first established in the reign of Yingzong of the Northern Song dynasty (960–1127). In late Yuan dynasty (1271–1368), Zhang Shicheng used the temple as his Xinggong.  It has been burned down and rebuilt several times, due wars and natural disasters. The current temple was rebuilt in 2003.

Architecture
The statues of Three Pure Ones are enshrined in the main hall of the temple.

References

Taoist temples in Zhejiang
Buildings and structures in Huzhou
Tourist attractions in Huzhou
2003 establishments in China
Religious buildings and structures completed in 2003